This is a list of venues used for professional baseball in Newark, New Jersey.

Parks
Harrison Park or Harrison Field
Home of: Newark Peppers - Federal League (1915); Newark Indians/Bears - International League (1916-1919); Newark Bears - International League (1921-mid-1923) (field burned on August 18, 1923)
Location: Harrison, New Jersey, a city adjacent to Newark - Middlesex Street (north, third base); South 3rd Street (east, left field); Burlington Avenue (south, right field); South 2nd Street (west, first base); also railroad yards skirting the southeast corner of the property.
Currently: Industrial plant

Meadowbrook Oval
Home of: Newark Bears - International League (mid-1923 - mid-1925) moved to Providence; moved back for 1926; Newark Dodgers - Negro National League (1934-35)
Location: South Orange Avenue (probably southwest); 12th Street (probably southeast).

Ruppert Stadium (originally Davids Stadium, then Bears Stadium)
Home of: Newark Bears - International League (1926-1949); Newark Eagles - Negro National League (1936-1948); also the site of some major league games from time to time
Other sports: Newark Bears - first American Football League (1926)
Location: Hamburg Place (now Wilson Avenue) (northeast, home plate); Avenue L (southeast, left field); East Kinney Street (southwest, center field); Avenue K (northwest, right field)
Currently: Industrial plant

Bears & Eagles Riverfront Stadium
Home of: Newark Bears (1999-2013)
Location: 450 Broad Street, Newark.

Ballpark(s) unknown or uncertain 

Some sources say Meadowbrook Oval
Newark Domestics/Little Giants - Eastern League (1884-1886)
Newark Giants - International League (1887 only)
Newark Trunkmakers - Central League (1888 only)
Newark Little Giants - Atlantic Association (1889-1890)
Newark - Atlantic League (1896-1900)
Newark Sailors/Indians - Eastern League/International League (1902 - mid-1915) (to Harrisburg)
Newark - Atlantic League (1907 only)
Newark Cubans - Atlantic League (1914 only) to Long Branch mid-1914
Newark Stars - Eastern Colored League (1926)
Newark Browns - East-West League (1932 only)

According to Okkonen, the International League club that played opposite the Federals in 1915 had their home field on a property bounded roughly by Wilson Avenue to the north, L Street T-ing in from the north, Delancy Street to the south, railroad tracks to the east. The site, later occupied by Ruppert Stadium, is currently occupied by a number of food service businesses.

See also

Sports in Newark, New Jersey
Lists of baseball parks

Sources
Peter Filichia, Professional Baseball Franchises, Facts on File, 1993.
Michael Benson, Ballparks of North America, McFarland, 1989.
Marc Okkonen, The Federal League of 1914-1915: Baseball's Third Major League, SABR, 1989.

External links
Summary of professional baseball in Newark
Summary of Newark Bears baseball
Summary of International League ballparks
Summary of Negro Leagues ballparks

Newark
Newark
Sports venues in Newark, New Jersey
Baseball
Baseball parks